Oracle Health Sciences is a family of software developed by Oracle Corporation which is primarily used to create clinical trials and to conduct pharmacovigilance based on the database created with it.

Oracle Argus
Oracle Argus is a pharmacovigilance product line that includes Oracle Argus Affiliate, Oracle Argus Analytics, Oracle Argus Dossier, Oracle Argus Insight, Oracle Argus Reconciliation, Oracle Argus Intercange, and Oracle Argus Safety.

References

Oracle software
Health care software
Clinical trials